Meadowbrook Terrace is an unincorporated community in northern Clay County, Florida, United States, just south of the border of Jacksonville.  The community is combined with Bellair and North Meadowbrook Terrace, to form the census-designated place of Bellair-Meadowbrook Terrace by the U.S. Census Bureau.

Communications 
The ZIP code that serves the community is 32073, and the local area code is 904.

Unincorporated communities in Clay County, Florida
Unincorporated communities in the Jacksonville metropolitan area
Unincorporated communities in Florida